Sylwester Wilczek (born 10 December 1936) is a Polish former ice hockey player and coach. He played for Gwardia Katowice and Górnik Katowice during his career. He also played for the Polish national team at the 1964 Winter Olympics and several World Championships. After his playing career he turned to coaching, and including two years as head coach of GKS Katowice, as Górnik had been renamed.

External links
 

1936 births
Living people
GKS Katowice (ice hockey) players
Ice hockey players at the 1964 Winter Olympics
Olympic ice hockey players of Poland
Polish ice hockey coaches
Polish ice hockey centres
Sportspeople from Katowice